Chorbadzhiysko (Bulgarian: Чорбаджийско, Turkish: Çorbacılar Köyü) is a village in Kirkovo Municipality, Kardzhali Province, southern Bulgaria. Its name, derived from Turkish, means "village of the soupmakers".

References

Villages in Kardzhali Province